The 2001 Davidson Wildcats football team represented Davidson College as a member of the Pioneer Football League during the 2001 NCAA Division I-AA football season. Led by first-year head coach Mike Toop, the Wildcats compiled an overall record of 5–4 with a mark of 1–2 in conference play, placing third in the South Division of the Pioneer.

Schedule

References

Davidson
Davidson Wildcats football seasons
Davidson Wildcats football